Oaktown's 3.5.7 was a rap group formed by MC Hammer in 1989, via his Bust It Records label and Capitol Records. Members included Sweet L.D. (Suhayla Sabir), Lil P (Phyllis Charles) and Terrible T (Tabatha Zee King-Brooks).

Hammer dubbed the group's name as a salute to their hometown of Oakland, and to emphasize the power of the trio as dancers (comparing them to a .357 Magnum).

Their 1989 album, Wild & Loose, peaked at number 126 on the Billboard 200 and number 23 on the Top R&B Albums chart. Their single, "Yeah, Yeah, Yeah", peaked at number 9 on the Billboard Hot Rap Songs chart.

The group disbanded in 1992.

Discography 
Albums
 Wild & Loose (1989)
 Fully Loaded (1991)

EPs
 Fila Treatment (1992)

Singles

References

External links 
 Biography on AllMusic

1989 establishments in the United States
African-American musical groups
American hip hop groups
Women hip hop groups
Musical groups established in 1989
American women rappers
African-American women rappers